Le Château des Rois ducs (also known as Château de Sauveterre) is a castle in the commune of Sauveterre-la-Lémance in the Lot-et-Garonne département of France.

History
It was constructed at the end of the 13th century by Edward I of England on one of the principal routes between Périgord and Agenais. During the Hundred Years' War, it became a centrepiece in the Anglo-French war of attrition. It was burned in 1789 during the French Revolution.

It was bought by the aviator Jean Mermoz in 1936, less than a year before his death. He had seen the castle from the air. After his death, the castle was abandoned and became the property of the commune until it was sold in the 1980s.

The castle in its entirety, as well as its grounds and moat, have been classified as historical monuments since 19 September 2003. It is privately owned.

Description
Built on a rocky outcrop, it overlooks the valleys of the Lémance and the Sendroux. It is located not far from Périgord Noir (Dordogne) and Quercy (Lot).

See also
List of castles in France

References

Bibliography
 Philippe Tholin, "Le château de Sauveterre-la-Lémance", in La vallée de la Lémance et sa région, Revue d'histoire de Lot-et-Garonne et de l'ancien Agenois, Académie des sciences, lettres et arts d'Agen, July–September 2006, vol 133(3) 
 Georges Tholin, "Le château de Sauveterre-la-Lémance", Revue de l'Agenais, 1897, vol 23, pp. 193–200 
 Stéphane Capot, "091 - Sauveterre-la-Lémance, château et bourg féodal, Le Festin", series Le Lot-et-Garonne en 101 sites et monuments, 2014, pp. 118–119

External links
Ministry of Culture listings for
  
 
 Château des Rois ducs on Castleland.com 

Castles in Nouvelle-Aquitaine
Buildings and structures in Lot-et-Garonne
Monuments historiques of Nouvelle-Aquitaine